Gary Finley (born 14 November 1970) is a former professional football central defender and non-league manager. He played in the Football League for Doncaster Rovers and was most recently Assistant Professional Development Coach at Blackburn Rovers .

Career
Born in Liverpool, Finley played for Marine, Warrington Town, Vauxhall Motors, Curzon Ashton and Netherfield before joining Doncaster Rovers. He made his debut in the League Cup in August 1997, as Doncaster lost 2–1 away to Nottingham Forest, and played eight times in the league that season as they were relegated to the Conference. Upon leaving Doncaster he returned to Netherfield, moving on to Hyde United and to Welsh side Conwy United in 1998 before joining Aberystwyth Town in November 1999.

He became player-manager of Aberystwyth in December 2001, a post he held until resigning less than a fortnight before the 2004–05 season, after the club's most successful period in 20 years. They reached their highest league placing, winning the MWC Cup and qualifying for the Inter Toto cup, drawing the home leg before finally bowing out to Dinaburg FC from Latvia. On leaving Aberystwyth, he had a brief spell as a player with Total Network Solutions, also appearing for Colwyn Bay on seconds forms, before becoming player-manager at Witton Albion in November 2004. He and his assistant Lee Coathup left Witton by mutual consent in October 2005, following the club stating that it would be reducing the playing budget.

Finley was appointed assistant manager at Lancaster City in December 2005, remaining in that post until July 2006 when he took over as manager from the departed Peter Ward. In January 2007, he took over as manager of Colwyn Bay, where a massive upsurge in form saw them qualify for the Unibond playoffs, only to lose to Cammell Laird in injury time.

In 2008-15 Finley joined Blackburn Rovers category 1 academy, where he was Professional Development Coach.

For several years now, Gary Finley has been a full-time youth coach for Blackburn Rovers Football team academy where he is in charge of professional development for 18–23 age group.

References

External sources
 

Living people
1970 births
Footballers from Liverpool
English footballers
Association football defenders
Marine F.C. players
Warrington Town F.C. players
Vauxhall Motors F.C. players
Curzon Ashton F.C. players
Kendal Town F.C. players
Doncaster Rovers F.C. players
Hyde United F.C. players
Conwy Borough F.C. players
Aberystwyth Town F.C. players
The New Saints F.C. players
Colwyn Bay F.C. players
Witton Albion F.C. players
English Football League players
Cymru Premier players
English football managers
Aberystwyth Town F.C. managers
Witton Albion F.C. managers
Lancaster City F.C. managers
Colwyn Bay F.C. managers
Blackburn Rovers F.C. non-playing staff
Cymru Premier managers